Nijat Kabul F.C. is a football team in Afghanistan. They play in the Afghan First League.

Current squad 

Football clubs in Afghanistan
Sport in Kabul